Mont Blanc is a mountain in the Montes Alpes range on the Moon. Its width is about 25 kilometers; the height is 3.7–3.8 km above adjacent plains of Mare Imbrium and 1.12 km above lunar level of zero elevation (a sphere with radius 1737.4 km).

The name of Mont Blanc, the highest mountain of terrestrial Alps, was proposed for this mountain by Johann Hieronymus Schröter. It was approved by International Astronomical Union in 1935. It is the only summit of Montes Alpes with proper name and the only extraterrestrial mountain, whose international name contains French word "Mont" instead of Latin "Mons".

Despite statements that lunar Mont Blanc, like terrestrial one, is a highest mountain of its Alps, measurements of Lunar Reconnaissance Orbiter show that it is only third, being 600 meters lower than the highest one and about 100 m lower than the second.

References

Links
 Map of the region
 Mont Blanc in The-Moon Wiki

Related articles
 - including Mont Blanc

Blanc, Mont